Gerard Arnout Hasselaer (20 February 1698, Amsterdam - 12 July 1766, Heemstede) was a burgomaster and counsellor of the city of Amsterdam, and a Director of the Dutch East India Company.

Some historians have said he was an able regent.
Others have said he was conservative and not truly capable.
A contemporary, said he was "idle and preoccupied with his own pleasures."
On 18 October 1748 Hasselaer was among the High and Mighty Lords of the States General of the United Provinces who were signatories to the Treaty of Aix-la-Chapelle (1748) which ended the War of the Austrian Succession.
Hasselaer was a director of the Indian Council when, in December 1748, Joan Gideon Loten obtained a position as a Councillor extraordinary.

Hasselaer took an interest in navigation, and possessed a collection of scientific instruments.
He represented William IV, Prince of Orange in three Dutch Admiralties.  At this time the Dutch were trying to catch up with the English in navigational knowledge and skills, and Hasselaer assisted in this process. In 1757 John May (shipwright) was appointed. On his death Hasselaer left a collection of 266 objects, including navigational instruments. In November 1776 Utrecht University acquired an "extra fine octant in its case" made by Jonathan Sisson (c.1690-1747), a London-based maker of scientific instruments, from this collection. 
Hasselaer, as regent of Amsterdam, was in contact with Sisson and with his Amsterdam-based brother-in-law Benjamin Ayres, also an instrument maker. Jan Hope, his neighbor bought his estate in Heemstede.

Bibliography
Inventories of Hasselaer's collection and his library were published for the auction of 1776.

References
Citations

Sources

External links

1698 births
1766 deaths
Mayors of Amsterdam
Administrators of the Dutch East India Company